The Heinkel HD 28 was a reconnaissance seaplane developed in Germany in the 1920s for export to Japan. It was a conventional single-bay biplane with equal-span, unstaggered wings and three cockpits in tandem. The fuselage was braced to both the upper and lower wings with a number of struts on its sides, in addition to the normal cabane struts. The rudder extended below the line of the lower fuselage, and there was a large ventral fin fitted. The rearmost cockpit incorporated a ring mount for a gunner.

A single example built by Heinkel and supplied to Aichi as a pattern aircraft, given the designation Aichi Experimental Three-seat Reconnaissance Seaplane, for possible production in Japan, but was rejected due to problems with the engine and also failure to meet performance and weight reduction targets.

Specifications

References

Further reading
 

1920s German military reconnaissance aircraft
Floatplanes
HD 28
Biplanes
Single-engined tractor aircraft
Aircraft first flown in 1926